Bangarapet Junction railway station, also known as Bangarapete Junction railway station (station code:BWT) is a double-line electrified railway station which is located in the heart of the city. It is one of the important railway stations in the Chennai Central–Bangalore City line where many people board and de-board for many purposes.

Some of the major routes that cross this station are MGR Chennai Central, New Tinsukia Jn in the Northeast part of India, Howrah Jn, and many more. Some of the popular trains crossing this station and traveling towards Bengaluru are Lalbagh SF Express (12607/12608), Brindavan Express (12639/12640) and Chennai–Bangalore Double Decker Express (22625/22626) and many more.

History
Madras Cantonment to Jolarpettai as a branch on the newly constructed Chennai–Beypur line in 1864. The station was then known by the name as Kolar Road for its proximity to the Kolar Gold fields and later christened as Bowringpet, the name of a District collector of the British of the area. Bangalore Mail started running around the same period, the exact date not being very clear.

The narrow-gauge Yeshvantapur–Devanhalli–Chikballapur line was opened in 1915 and was linked to Bangalore via Sidlaghatta, Chintamani, Srinivasapura under Yelahanka-Bangarpet narrow-gauge line in 1918. Gauge conversion of the Bangarpet–Kolar line was completed and opened for traffic in 1997 and since then it has been serviced by a railbus. Gauge conversion of Yelankha–Chickballapur was completed and opened for traffic in 2004. Then, gauge conversion of Chickballapur–Kolar was completed and opened for traffic in November 2013, thus connecting the entire network into an Yelankha–Bangarpet broad-gauge line.

The  broad gauge Bangarpet–Marikuppam line opened in 1894.

Electrification
The Mulanur–Bangarpet–Bangalore City sector was electrified in 1991–92.

Amenities
The Bangarapet railway station has a subscriber trunk dialing booth, computerized reservation counter, waiting room, vegetarian refreshment stall, tea stall and book stall.

References

External links
Trains at Bangarpet

Railway junction stations in Karnataka
Railway stations in Kolar district
Bangalore railway division
Railway stations opened in 1864